Matheus Luiz Nunes  (born 27 August 1998) is a professional footballer who plays as a midfielder for Premier League club Wolverhampton Wanderers and the Portugal national team.

Nunes started his career with Ericeirense, before moving to LigaPro side Estoril. During his time with the club, Nunes played mostly in the reserve team, before moving to Primeira Liga side Sporting CP in January 2019. With Sporting, Nunes won a Primeira Liga title and back-to-back Taças da Liga in 2021 and 2022, while being part of the squad that won a double in 2021, leading to him being named in the Primeira Liga Team of the Year in 2022. In August, Nunes signed with Premier League side Wolverhampton Wanderers for a club-record transfer worth €45 million (£38 million).

Born and raised in Brazil until 12 years old, Nunes opted to play for the Portugal national team, and made his senior international debut in 2021, representing the side at the 2022 FIFA World Cup.

Club career

Early career
Born in Rio de Janeiro, his father left his family, Nunes moved to Ericeira, Lisbon District at the age of 12 with his mother and his Portuguese stepfather. He started playing football with local side Ericeirense in the 6th division, and also helped his family in their bakery for a short period while playing.

Nunes made his senior debut for Ericeirense during the 2015–16 season, in the Lisbon Football Association. He started the 2017 pre-season on trial at Oriental, but was not signed due to a thigh injury, and subsequently returned to his first club.

Estoril
Nunes signed with Estoril in the summer of 2018. He made his debut in the LigaPro on 14 October in a 2–2 draw against Varzim, starting but leaving injured shortly before the end of the first half. During most of his spell, he was associated to the reserve team.

Sporting CP
On 29 January 2019, Nunes joined Sporting CP of the Primeira Liga on a five-and-a-half-year contract for a €500,000 fee for half of his economic rights, and a €45 million buyout clause. His performances against Sporting for Estoril in the Taça da Liga group stage in the 2018–19 season was noted by Sporting scouting team, who decided to sign him.

After playing for the club's under-23 team, Nunes received his first call-up to the first team by manager Rúben Amorim on 4 June 2020, coming on as a second-half substitute in the 2–2 draw at Vitória de Guimarães in the Primeira Liga. On 23 October, he agreed to a contract extension by a further year, increasing his buyout clause from €45 million to €60 million, with the club deciding to pay Estoril €450,000 for the other half of his economic rights.

Nunes scored his first goal in the Portuguese top division on 2 January 2021, closing the 2–0 home victory over Braga. His second came the following 1 February, in injury time to help the hosts defeat Benfica 1–0 in the Derby de Lisboa, being named man of the match. Following the departure of João Mário, he earned a permanent place in the starting eleven, and on 15 September, on in his UEFA Champions League debut, he provided an assist for Paulinho in a 5–1 away defeat to Ajax. After helping Sporting on a run of six consecutive league wins, including the Derby de Lisboa against Benfica, where provided an assist and scored a goal in a 3–1 away victory, Nunes was named the league's Midfielder of the Month for the months of October and November. On 15 February 2022, in the first leg of the round of 16 tie of the Champions League, despite his team 5–0 home loss to Manchester City, Pep Guardiola, who was impressed by the calibre of Nunes' performances, praised him as "one of the best players in the world".

Wolverhampton Wanderers
On 17 August 2022, Nunes signed a five-year contract with English Premier League club Wolverhampton Wanderers for a club-record transfer worth €45 million (£38 million), surpassing the former record signing compatriot Fábio Silva.

Nunes made his Wolves debut three days later, as a starter in a 1–0 defeat against Tottenham Hotspur at the Tottenham Hotspur Stadium in the Premier League on 20 August 2022. Nunes made his home Premier League debut in a 1–1 draw with Newcastle United at Molineux on 28 August 2022.

International career
On 8 August 2021, after living in the country for ten years, Nunes received his Portuguese passport. Late in that month, on his 23rd birthday, he was called up by Brazil national team manager Tite as one of nine replacements for the players based in the United Kingdom, for three 2022 FIFA World Cup qualifiers against Chile, Argentina and Peru; He refused the call, as he would have had to quarantine on return due not having the complete COVID-19 vaccination. Ultimately, Nunes decided not to represent his country of birth, after he was contacted by Portugal's national team manager Fernando Santos, who convinced him to represent Portugal.

Nunes was called by Santos on 30 September 2021 for World Cup qualifiers against Luxembourg and a friendly with Qatar. He won his first cap on 9 October, starting the 3–0 friendly win over Qatar in the Algarve. He scored his first international goal the following 22 March in a 3–1 home win over Turkey in the semi-finals of the qualification play-offs.

In October, he was named in Portugal's preliminary 55-man squad for the 2022 FIFA World Cup in Qatar, being included in the final 26-man squad for the tournament.

Style of play
Nunes is usually deployed in double pivot in 3–4–3 formation, operating as a number 8 looking to get forward and contribute to the attack and also has a good passing range, as he can make different types of passes whether he is looking to switch the play or try and break lines with penetrative passes or  passes that split the opposition backline, which he is highly effective. He also has the ability to carry the ball and make progressive runs, using a combination of speed and strength to make these runs, while also displaying good technique on the ball. Nunes also posses a good anticipation and reading of the game, which allows him to make effective interceptions and challenges.

Career statistics

Club

International

Scores and results list Portugal's goal tally first, score column indicates score after each Nunes goal.

Honours
Sporting CP
Primeira Liga: 2020–21
Taça da Liga: 2020–21, 2021–22
Supertaça Cândido de Oliveira: 2021

Individual
Primeira Liga Midfielder of the Month: October/November 2021
Primeira Liga Team of the Year: 2021–22

References

External links

Profile at the Wolverhampton Wanderers F.C. website

1998 births
Living people
People from Mafra, Portugal
Footballers from Rio de Janeiro (city)
Portuguese footballers
Portugal international footballers
Brazilian footballers
Brazilian people of Portuguese descent
Brazilian emigrants to Portugal
Naturalised citizens of Portugal
Association football midfielders
Primeira Liga players
Liga Portugal 2 players
G.D. Estoril Praia players
Sporting CP footballers
Wolverhampton Wanderers F.C. players
Brazilian expatriate footballers
Expatriate footballers in Portugal
Brazilian expatriate sportspeople in Portugal
Portuguese expatriate footballers
Expatriate footballers in England
Brazilian expatriate sportspeople in England
Portuguese expatriate sportspeople in England
Premier League players
2022 FIFA World Cup players